Desulfonatronovibrionaceae is a family of bacteria belonging to the phylum Thermodesulfobacteriota.

References

Desulfovibrionales
Bacteria families